The 2001 season was the Baltimore Ravens' sixth season in the National Football League (NFL) and the third under head coach Brian Billick.

Fresh off their victory trip from Super Bowl XXXV, bad news struck the 2001 Ravens as running back Jamal Lewis suffered a knee injury in training camp and would miss the entire season. This weakened the Ravens’ running game and defense, they also got swept by the Browns for the first time since they returned to Cleveland, and they also failed to equal their 12–4 record from 2000, instead going 10–6 but eventually reaching the postseason for the second consecutive year.

They easily shut down the Miami Dolphins, 20–3 in the Wild Card Round, but were unable to stop the 13–3 Pittsburgh Steelers, in the next round, due to a series of turnovers and penalties.

Offseason 
Throughout training camp, the team was the first to be covered by and featured on the HBO series Hard Knocks.

Draft

Staff

Roster

Schedule

Preseason

Regular season

Note: Intra-division opponents are in bold text.

Postseason

Division standings

Game summaries

AFC wild card game vs Miami Dolphins

AFC Divisional Playoff vs Pittsburgh Steelers

at Heinz Field, Pittsburgh, Pennsylvania

 Game time: 12:30 pm EST
 Game weather:  (Mostly Cloudy)
 Game attendance: 63,976
 Referee: Tony Corrente
 TV announcers: (CBS) Dick Enberg (play by play), Dan Dierdorf (color commentator), Bonnie Bernstein (sideline reporter)

References 

 Ravens on Pro Football Reference
 Ravens Schedule on jt-sw.com

Baltimore Ravens
Baltimore Ravens seasons
Baltimore Ravens
2000s in Baltimore